Farhat Nursultanuly Abdraimov  (Farhat Nūrsūltanūly Äbdıraiymov; (21 January 1966 – 21 May 2021) was a Kazakh actor.

Biography 
Father-Abdraimov Nursultan, Kazakh. Mother — Abdraimiva Ushuhan Mamedov, Uyghur. was born in Almaty to a Muslim family in the Kazakh Soviet Socialist Republic on 21 January 1966. Farhat died in Tbilisi, Georgia, on 21 May 2021 from a heart attack during filming.

Selected filmography
 1996 — Whoever Softer
 1996 — Shanghai
 1998 —  Fara
 2010 — Tale of Pink Hare
 2011   — Returning to the 'A'

Awards
 1996 —  Russian Film Award   Best Actor in 1996 in Moscow (together with Sergei Bodrov Jr.) 
 1999 —  Prize   Silver St. George   for Best Actor in the film  Farah   21st Moscow International Film Festival  
 2003 —  Diploma of the President of the Republic of Kazakhstan
 2014 — Order of Kurmet
 2016 — Medal of 25 years of independence of the Republic of Kazakhstan

References

External links
 

1966 births
2021 deaths
People from Almaty
20th-century Kazakhstani male actors
21st-century Kazakhstani male actors
Recipients of the Order of Kurmet
Nur Otan politicians
Filmed deaths from natural causes